Džafića Brdo is a village in the municipality of Bijelo Polje, Montenegro.

Demographics
According to the 2003 census, the village had a population of 945 people.

According to the 2011 census, its population was 156.

References

Populated places in Bijelo Polje Municipality